Muhammed Muhsin (born 17 February, 1986)  also known as Muhammed Muhassin is an Indian politician and a Member of 14th Kerala Legislative Assembly from Pattambi Constituency in Palakkad district. He is the youngest MLA in 14th Kerala Legislative Assembly. He defeated the three-term senior Congress Party MLA, CP Mohammed with a margin of 7404 Votes in 2016 Kerala Assembly Election.

Education 
Muhsin is a research scholar from Jawaharlal Nehru University. He graduated in Electronics and Computer Applications from H.M. College Manjeri and completed his Masters in social work from Amrita Vishwa Vidyapeetham, Coimbatore and his MPhil from University of Madras.

Family 
Muhsin, second of seven children  of Puthen Peediyakkal Aboobecker Haji and Jameela Beegam from Ongallur panchayat and also he is the grandchild of Islamic scholar Karakkad Manu Musliyar.

Political career
Muhsin, a student of School of Social Science at Jawaharlal Nehru University, Delhi, was the vice president of AISF in university, and a college mate of JNU Student Union president Kanhaiya Kumar.

References

Living people
Kerala MLAs 2016–2021
Communist Party of India politicians from Kerala
Jawaharlal Nehru University alumni
1986 births